Wilkes-Barre General Hospital is a for-profit hospital located in northeastern Pennsylvania. Wilkes-Barre specializes in cardiovascular care, but also works with cancer, oncology, and renal disease among others.

History
Commonwealth Health Wilkes-Barre General Hospital is Northeastern Pennsylvania's largest community hospital with 412 beds and a medical staff of more than 400 physicians representing nearly 50 medical and surgical specialties. Wilkes-Barre General Hospital is a member of the Commonwealth Health Network.

The hospital opened on October 10, 1872, as Wilkes-Barre City Hospital. The name changed to Wilkes-Barre General Hospital in 1925. The hospital was sold to Community Health Systems on May 1, 2009.

Services
Bariatric Weight Loss,
Cancer Care,
Diagnostic Imaging,
Digestive Health,
Ear, Nose & Throat Care,
Emergency Services,
Endocrinology,
Eye Care,
Heart Care,
Infectious Disease Care,
Intensive Care,
Kidney Disorders
Laboratory Services,
Maternity Care,
Neurology,
Orthopedic Services,
Pain Management,
Pediatric Care,
Primary Care,
Rehabilitation Services,
Respiratory Care,
Rheumatology,
Robotic Surgery,
Sleep Medicine,
Surgical Services (Inpatient and Outpatient),
Urology,
Women's Health,
Wound Care.

Awards & Recognitions
Joint Commission Hospital Accreditation,
Joint Commission Laboratory Accreditation,
American Association of Blood Bank Accreditation,
Joint Commission Disease/Condition-specific Accreditations for:
Hip Replacement,
Knee Replacement,
Shoulder Replacement,
Spine Surgery,
Spine Microdiscectomy Surgery,
Primary Stroke Care,
Wound Care,
American College of Cardiology-Chest Pain Accreditation,
Intersocietal Accreditation Commission for Echocardiography Accreditation,
American College of Radiology:
Mammography Accreditation,
CT Accreditation,
Ultrasound Accreditation,
PET CAN/CT Scan Accreditation,
Nuclear Medicine,
Lung Cancer Screening Center,
Intersocietal Accreditation Commission Vascular Ultrasound Accreditation,
Intersocietal Accreditation Commission Nuclear Medicine Accreditation,
Intersocietal Accreditation Commission CT Accreditation,
American College of Radiology Nuclear Cardiology,
Commission on Accreditation of Rehabilitation Facilities (CARF) Accreditation,
Blue Cross Distinction Cardiac Care,
Blue Cross Distinction Spine Surgery,
Blue Cross Distinction Hip/Knee Replacement Surgery.

References

External links
 

Hospitals in Pennsylvania
Buildings and structures in Wilkes-Barre, Pennsylvania